Christopher Dwyer (date of birth unknown, died 2 February 1945) was an Australian cricketer. He played three first-class cricket matches for Victoria in 1912.

See also
 List of Victoria first-class cricketers

References

External links
 

Year of birth missing
1945 deaths
Australian cricketers
Victoria cricketers
Place of birth missing